KFRQ (94.5 FM) is a radio station broadcasting a classic rock format. Licensed to Harlingen, Texas, United States, the station serves the Rio Grande Valley area. The station is currently owned by Entravision. It shares a studio with its sister stations in McAllen, Texas, while its transmitter is located in La Feria, Texas.

History
The station began around 1960 as easy listening station KELT-FM and was co-owned with KGBT AM and television. Some of the TV personalities such as anchorman Frank "FM" Sullivan and weathercaster Larry James hosted music programs on the station. Frank's wife Hilda Sullivan would anchor locally produced newsbreaks called "Micronews." The station would soon automate and update the programming to adult contemporary using Drake-Chenault's "Hit Parade". The station would later change to country music as "K-Frog" and would on March 1, 1992, change its call sign to the current KFRQ. On January 1, 1995, the station changed formats to rock under the direction of Program Director Alan Sells. On December 15, 2017, Entravision conducted a corporate restructure, firing over half the air staff, including their morning show hosts for over 20 years, Big Al and Charlie.

On April 13, 2020, KFRQ shifted their format from active rock to classic rock, still under the "Q94.5" name. The change came two weeks after sister station KKPS changed their format from Regional Mexican to Bilingual Rhythmic CHR. Sister station KVLY also switched their format from Contemporary hit radio back to Adult Contemporary the same day. With the change, this brought back the Classic rock format to the Rio Grande Valley for the first since 2015, when iHeartMedia-owned station KQXX-FM dropped that format for a simulcast of Hot AC-formatted station KHKZ, also owned by iHeartMedia. KRIX also flipped to Classic Rock on the same day, thus sparking a “Classic Rock” war between both stations.

References

External links
KFRQ - Official Website

FRQ
Classic rock radio stations in the United States
Radio stations established in 1983
Harlingen, Texas
Entravision Communications stations